Antisleep Vol. 02 is the third studio album by American multi-genre project Blue Stahli, and the second  instrumental-based album, after Antisleep Vol. 01, the digital album was released on December 9, 2011 and the CD was released on December 16, 2011. Like its predecessor, the majority of the tracks are instrumental-based, with the exception of "Let's Go" and "So So Bad".

Track listing

Bonus instrumental tracks

References 

2011 albums
Blue Stahli albums